The 2025 Western Australian state election is scheduled to be held on 8 March 2025 to elect members to the Parliament of Western Australia, where all 59 seats in the Legislative Assembly and all 37 seats in the Legislative Council will be up for election.

Candidates will be elected to single-member seats in the Legislative Assembly via full-preferential instant-runoff voting. In the Legislative Council, 37 candidates are elected across the state, which functions as a single electorate.

Background
The 2021 state election saw Labor win one of the most comprehensive victories on record at the state or territory level in Australia. It won 53 of the 59 seats, surpassing its own record set four years earlier for the largest government majority and seat tally in Western Australian parliamentary history.

Electoral system
Candidates are elected to single-member seats in the Legislative Assembly via full-preferential instant-runoff voting. In the Legislative Council, 37 candidates are elected across the state, which functions as a single electorate.

Legislative Council voting changes
In September 2021, the McGowan Labor Government introduced the "one vote, one value" legislation to change the voting system for the Legislative Council at this election. Under the then-existing voting system for the upper house, which had been in place since 2005, voters were divided into six regions of unequal weight, each of whom were responsible for electing six candidates (36 in total). Three of the regions were based in metropolitan Perth, and three in the regions. This meant that a region like the Mining and Pastoral region had 16% of the average number of electors in the three metropolitan regions. The government proposed abolishing the regions and replacing them with what it called a "one vote, one value" system. Instead, 37 members will be elected from a single statewide constituency. This increased the size of the council by one seat. Group voting tickets, which were abolished for the federal Senate in 2016 and are utilised only for the Victorian Legislative Council, would also be abolished. Votes are instead cast under an optional preferential voting system, requiring electors to vote for one or more
preferred parties above the dividing line on the ballot paper, or at least 20 candidates below the dividing line. The legislation passed the parliament on 17 November 2021 and received royal assent seven days thereafter.

Key dates
Elections are scheduled for the second Saturday of March every four years, in line with legislative changes made in 2011.

While the Legislative Assembly has fixed four-year terms, the Governor of Western Australia may still dissolve the Assembly and call an election early on the advice of the Premier.

Retiring MPs

Labor
Sue Ellery MLC (South Metropolitan)

National
Mia Davies MLA (Central Wheatbelt) – announced 27 January 2023

Liberal
Peter Collier MLC (North Metropolitan)

Opinion polling

2023

2022

References

Elections in Western Australia
2025 elections in Australia
2020s in Western Australia